Howard J. Clifford (1870 – 1940) was a Michigan politician.

Political life
The Flint City Commission select him as mayor in 1934 for a single year.

References

Mayors of Flint, Michigan
1870 births
1940 deaths
20th-century American politicians